Belfast is a ghost town in Greeley County, Nebraska, in the United States.

History
The railroad was extended to Belfast in the late 19th century. The community takes its name from Belfast, in Northern Ireland.

Belfast had a post office briefly from 1908 until 1909.

While no buildings are still standing at the site, deep holes indicate foundations and cellars. Numerous concrete floors can be seen and large pieces of metal are scattered throughout the site. The railroad grade is very clear to someone looking down from a nearby hill. The area is now used for grazing cattle.

References

Geography of Greeley County, Nebraska
Unincorporated communities in Nebraska